Kyzylkol is a lake in Sozak District, Turkestan Region, Kazakhstan. 

Kyzylkol lake is a  Important Bird Area, where tens and even hundreds of thousands of birds may rest at the lake at a given time.

Geography
Kyzylkol is located in an arid area to the north of the northern slopes of the Karatau Mountains. The lake has an elongated shape from east to west. It lies at the bottom of a round basin, surrounded by two terrace-like concentric strips of terrain with takir and salt marsh near the shores. The western and southern coastline is steep with loess cliffs, but to the north and east it is flat. The Ushbas river flows into the southeastern shore of the lake from the Karatau. The waters of the lake are brackish, turning to saline in the summer, when the riverbed dries and doesn't reach Kyzylkol.

Flora and fauna 
Semi-desert vegetation grows near Kyzylkol, with saltwort and tamarisk close to the lakeshore. Further away grow camelthorn, wormwood, common salttree and needlegrass. 

The lake is an important place for the breeding, migrating and wintering of a number of water bird species, including the ruddy shelduck, northern shoveler, garganey, Eurasian teal, gadwall, mallard, common shelduck, greylag goose, little ringed plover and pale sand martin, as well as waders. The main fish species in the lake are carp and karabalik.

See also
List of lakes of Kazakhstan

References

External links
Kyzylkol lake in Turkestan region, Kazakhstan.

Lakes of Kazakhstan
Turkistan Region
Important Bird Areas of Kazakhstan

ru:Кызылколь (озеро, Туркестанская область)